Charles Henry Reynolds Wollaston (31 July 1849 – 22 June 1926) was an English footballer who played as a forward for Wanderers and England. He won the FA Cup five times with Wanderers, becoming the first player to do so. Wollaston was born in Felpham, Sussex and died in Westminster.

Football career 
Wollaston played for Wanderers in the inaugural FA Cup Final in 1872 and scored in the second half of the 1873 final. In all he won five winner's medals, the first player to achieve this feat. Arthur Kinnaird, James Forrest and Patrick Vieira are the only other players with five FA Cup winning medals, and all of them are only bettered by Ashley Cole, who has won the FA Cup six times, beating the record in 2010. In Wanderers' 1874 FA Cup first round match against Farningham, Wollaston scored four goals in a 16–0 victory for Wanderers; the match was Wanderers biggest ever win. Wollaston had previously scored hat-tricks in 1872 against Clapham Rovers and in 1873 against Civil Service.

In 1879, Wollaston became Wanderers' club secretary, and was also the club's captain. In total, Wollaston played ten seasons for Wanderers and became the club's second top scorer, before joining Clapham Rovers in 1880/81. He earned four caps for England, scoring one goal. Wollaston captained the national side against Scotland in 1880; he was the eighth English team captain. Wollaston is also recorded as having refereed an 1884 match between Old Westminsters and Wednesbury Town.

In 2013, Wollaston was included on a special London Tube map released by the Football Association to celebrate its 150th anniversary. The map replaced station names with famous footballers.

Honours
Wanderers
FA Cup winners: 1872, 1873, 1876, 1877 & 1878

International goals
Scores and results list England's goal tally first.

Cricket career
Wollaston is known to have appeared in a total of 13 cricket matches between 1863 and 1869, although he did not play any first-class matches. He made appearances for Lancing College, FH Birley's XI, Oxford University freshman, and an Etceteras team. His first recorded appearance was for Lancing College against Brighton College at the Royal Brunswick Ground; Wollaston made scores of 6 and 12* in the match. Wollaston made a half-century in a match for FH Birley's XI against S Pelham's XI, and his last known match was for an Etceteras team against a Perambulators team, in which he scored 9 and 29*, and took one wicket.

References

External links

1849 births
1926 deaths
Association football forwards
Clapham Rovers F.C. players
England international footballers
England v Scotland representative footballers (1870–1872)
English cricketers
English footballers
English solicitors
FA Cup Final players
Oxford University A.F.C. players
People educated at Lancing College
People from Felpham
Wanderers F.C. players